Human rights violations during the Syrian civil war have been numerous and serious, with United Nations reports stating that the war has been "characterized by a complete lack of adherence to the norms of international law" by the warring parties who have "caused civilians immeasurable suffering". For a relatively small number of these war crimes, prosecution of Syrian civil war criminals has resulted.

The casualties of the Syrian Civil War have been great; UN envoy to Syria Staffan de Mistura stated in April 2016 that 400,000 people had died in the conflict. In December 2016, 450,000 Syrians were estimated to have been killed; 4.8 million Syrians fled Syria (becoming refugees), 6.3 million were internally displaced within Syria, and 13.5 million required humanitarian assistance. The war has been marked by "devastation and extreme suffering among civilians" and international aid groups "have long denounced the indiscriminate brutality" that has characterized the conflict. In March 2017, the Syrian Observatory for Human Rights reported that 465,000 people had died in the conflict, of which 96,000 civilians, and an additional 145,000 civilians were missing. The SOHR attributed 83,500 civilian deaths to the regime of Syrian President Bashar al-Assad and its allies, including Russia; 7,000 to Syrian rebels and allied forces; 3,700 to Islamic State of Iraq and the Levant (ISIL); 920 to the U.S.-led coalition; and 500 to Turkey.

According to various human rights organizations and the United Nations, human rights violations have been committed by both the government and the rebels, with the "vast majority of the abuses having been committed by the Syrian government". The U.N. commission investigating human rights abuses in Syria confirms at least nine intentional mass killings in the period 2012 to mid-July 2013, identifying the perpetrator as the Syrian government and its supporters in eight cases, and the opposition in one. The United Nations has since conducted several further studies. The Assad regime has used chemical weapons (chlorine gas) against civilians and conducted torture and extrajudicial killings. Assad has also used "Indiscriminate and disproportionate aerial bombardment and shelling" which "led to mass civilian casualties and spread terror." Brutal repression, human rights abuses, war crimes and crimes against humanity perpetrated by the Assad regime throughout the course of the conflict has led to international condemnation and widespread calls to convict Bashar al-Assad in the International Criminal Court (ICC).

War crimes committed by rebel groups include recruiting child soldiers, shelling civilian-populated areas, kidnapping, and murdering members of religious minorities. In May 2013, UN commission of inquiry investigator Carla Del Ponte said there were "strong concrete suspicions but not yet incontrovertible proof" that rebels had used the nerve agent sarin. The following day, in an apparent reaction to Del Ponte's comments, the commission issued a press release clarifying that it "has not reached conclusive findings as to the use of chemical weapons in Syria by any parties in the conflict".

Civilian casualties from airstrikes by the US-led coalition fighting ISIL are considerable; the Syrian Network for Human Rights reported 2,286 civilian deaths since the beginning of the campaign until September 2017, raising concerns that the coalition failed to take necessary precautions to minimize civilian casualties. Unlawful attacks against civilians and civilian structures in Syria have also been made by the Syrian-Russian coalition forces and other parties, in particular the Russian–Syrian hospital bombing campaign, as well as attacks on schools and mosques. According to Amnesty International's 2017/8 report on Syria, "Parties to the armed conflict committed war crimes and other grave violations of international humanitarian law and human rights abuses with impunity."

Ba'athist Syrian Armed Forces and allied forces
According to a 2011 UN report, Syrian armed and security forces may be responsible for: 
unlawful killing, including of children (mostly boys), medical personnel and hospital patients ("In some particularly grave instances, entire families were executed in their homes"); 
torture, including of children (mostly boys, sometimes to death) and hospital patients, and including sexual and psychological torture; 
arbitrary arrest "on a massive scale"; 
deployment of tanks and helicopter gunships in densely populated areas; 
heavy and indiscriminate shelling of civilian areas; 
collective punishment; 
enforced disappearances; 
widescale and systematic destruction and looting of property; 
the systematic denial, in some areas, of food and water; and 
the prevention of medical treatment, including to children – in the period since 15 March 2011.

Amnesty International entered the country without government approval in spring 2012 and documented "gross violations of human rights on a massive scale" by the Syrian military and shabiha, "many of which amount to crimes against humanity and war crimes". These were committed against the armed opposition, to punish and intimidate civilian individuals and strongholds perceived to be supporting the opposition, and indiscriminately against individuals who had nothing to do with the opposition. In addition to the crimes listed by the UN above, they noted cases of people being burnt alive; destruction of pharmacies and field hospitals (normal hospitals are out of bounds to those wounded by the military); and that the sometimes lethal torture ("broken bones, missing teeth, deep scars and open wounds from electric shocks, and from severe beatings and lashings with electric cables and other implements") was overwhelmingly directed at men and boys.

Amnesty reported that medical personnel had also been tortured, while the UN said that medical personnel in state hospitals were sometimes complicit in the killing and torture of patients. The execution and torture of children was also documented by Amnesty International and Human Rights Watch. Most of the serious human rights violations documented by the UN have been committed by the Syrian army and security services as part of military or search operations. The pattern of the killing, coupled with interviews with defectors, led the UN to conclude a shoot-to-kill policy was operative. The UN mentioned several reports of security forces killing injured victims by putting them into refrigerated cells in hospital morgues.

The UN reported 10,000 persons arbitrarily detained between mid-March and late-June 2011; a year later that number had more than doubled, though the true number of detainees may have been far higher. At the notorious Seidnaya jail, north of Damascus, 2,500 military officers and lesser ranks were being held after they disobeyed orders or attempted desertion. Human Rights Watch documented more than 20 different methods of torture used against detainees, including: prolonged and severe beatings, often with objects such as batons and wires; painful stress positions; electrocution; burning with car battery acid; sexual assault; pulling out fingernails; mock execution; and sexual violence. Many were held in disgusting and cruelly overcrowded conditions; many who needed medical assistance were denied it, and some consequently died.

Human Rights Watch accused the government and Shabiha of using civilians as human shields when they advanced on opposition-held areas. A UN report confirmed this, saying soldiers had used children as young as eight, detaining and killing children afterwards. The UN added the Syrian Government as one of the worst offenders on its annual "list of shame". In May 2012, Al Arabiya aired leaked footage of a man being tortured in a government detention centre in Kafranbel.

In response to these violations, the UN Human Rights Council passed a condemnatory resolution. It also demanded that Syria cooperate with a UN investigation into the abuses, release all political prisoners, and allow independent monitors to visit detention facilities.

The charity Save the Children conducted interviews in refugee camps with Syrian civilians who had fled the fighting, and released a report in September 2012 containing many accounts of detention, torture and summary execution, as well as other incidents such as the use of civilians as human shields, allegedly including tying children onto advancing tanks so that rebel forces would not fire upon them.

As of recently, the Syrian Army and several pro-Assad Shia Militias desecrated the grave of Umar Ibn Abdulaziz in Idlib. The attack took place on 29 May 2020.

Attacks on civilians in populated areas
A number of reports indicated that the Syrian government has attacked civilians at bread bakeries with artillery rounds and rockets in opposition-controlled cities and districts in Aleppo province and Aleppo city, shelling indiscriminately. HRW said these are war crimes, as the only military targets in the areas were rebels manning the bakeries and that dozens of civilians were killed.

Upon retaking the capital Damascus after the Battle of Damascus (2012), the Syrian government began a campaign of collective punishment against Sunni suburbs in-and-around the capital which had supported FSA presence in their neighborhoods.

In a 23 October 2012 statement, Human Rights Watch said that Syrian military denials notwithstanding, HRW had "evidence of ongoing cluster bomb attacks" by Syria's air force. HRW has confirmed reports "through interviews with victims, other residents and activists who filmed the cluster munitions", as well as "analysis of 64 videos and also photos showing weapon remnants" of cluster bomb strikes. The use, production, stockpiling, and transfer of cluster munitions is prohibited by the 2008 international Convention on Cluster Munitions treaty. Use of cluster bombs have been considered a grave threat to civilian populations because of the bombs' ability to randomly scatter thousands of submunitions or "bomblets" over a vast area, many of which remain waiting to explode, taking civilian lives and limbs long after the conflict is over.

David Nott, a British surgeon who volunteered for five weeks in mid-2013 on the ground in Syria at hospitals in conflict zone, reported that victims of government snipers would all display wounds in a particular area on particular days, indicating that they may have intentionally chosen to target a specific area each day as a sort of "game". On at least one occasion a pregnant women was found shot through the uterus, killing her unborn child.

The demolition of opposition neighbourhoods was reported during the conflict. The first incident of large-scale demolitions documented by Human Rights Watch took place in July 2012. HRW analysis of satellite imagery in 2014 showed that in the subsequent two years, the Syrian authorities had demolished a total of at least 145 hectares of mostly residential buildings in seven neighbourhoods in Hama and Damascus.

The Syrian government has reportedly used "barrel bombs" to attack civilian populations in rebel held territories in defiance of United Nations Security Council Resolution 2139 passed on 22 February 2014. The bombs are "cheaply made, locally produced, and typically constructed from large oil drums, gas cylinders, and water tanks, filled with high explosives and scrap metal to enhance fragmentation, and then dropped from helicopters".  Between February 2014 and January 2015, Human Rights Watch reports that "at least 450 major damage sites" in Syria "showed damage consistent with barrel bomb detonations". A local Syrian group estimates that in the first year after UN resolution 2139 was passed, aerial barrel bomb attacks killed 6,163 civilians in Syria, including 1,892 children. According to a UN investigation, in September 2016 the Syrian air force dropped barrel bombs from helicopters on a United Nations humanitarian aid convoy at Urum al-Kubra headed to Aleppo. The bombs were followed by rocket fire from jets, and strafing of survivors with machine guns, killing 14 aid workers. In a report issued 1 March 2017, the United Nations found the attack was "meticulously planned" and "ruthlessly carried out"—and because it was deliberate, a war crime.

According to three eminent international lawyers in the 2014 Syrian detainee report Syrian government officials could face war crimes charges in the light of a huge cache of evidence smuggled out of the country showing the "systematic killing" of about 11,000 detainees. Most of the victims were young men and many corpses were emaciated, bloodstained and bore signs of torture. Some had no eyes; others showed signs of strangulation or electrocution. Experts say this evidence is more detailed and on a far larger scale than anything else that has yet emerged from the 34-month crisis. According to a report by Amnesty International, published in November 2015, the Syrian regime has forcibly disappeared more than 65,000 people (who are yet to be heard from) since the beginning of the Syrian Civil War. According to a report in May 2016 by the Syrian Observatory for Human Rights, at least 60,000 people have been killed through torture or died from dire humanitarian conditions in Syrian government jails since March 2011.

In 2022 a video was published by The Guardian documenting a massacre in Tamador, where 41 civilians were shot, their bodies burned and buried in a pit. The executioner was identified as Amjad Youssuf from Syria's military intelligence Unit 227 and in a series of interview he confirmed the authenticity of the video and admitted to killing the civilians.

On 30 January 2014, Human Rights Watch released a report detailing, between June 2012 and July 2013, government forces razing to the ground seven anti-government districts in the cities of Damascus and Hama, equating to an area the size of 200 football fields. Witnesses spoke of explosives and bulldozers being used to knock down buildings. Satellite imagery was provided as part of the report and the destruction was characterized as collective punishment against residents of rebel-held areas.

On 28 June 2022, UN Human Rights Office published a report, following rigorous assessment and statistical analysis of available data on civilian casualties, that estimates 306,887 civilians were killed between 1 March 2011 and 31 March 2021 in Syria due to the conflict.

Attacks on medical personnel 
According to the UN Independent International Commission of Inquiry medical personnel have been targeted during the civil war.  According to Physicians for Human Rights, the Syrian government "responded to popular protests with months of sustained and extreme violence and intimidation, and an all-out assault on the country's medical system." The government has denied "wounded civilians impartial medical treatment", invaded, attacked and misused hospitals, attacked and impeded medical transport, and detained and tortured doctors for treating wounded civilians, according to the group.  In government-run hospitals pro-regime staff "routinely performed amputations for minor injuries, as a form of punishment", wounded protesters were taken from hospital wards by security and intelligence agents. Ambulances with wounded protesters were commandeered by security agents to go to facilities for interrogation and sometimes torture. In response medical personnel created secret medical units to treat injured. In 2019–2020 the UN Human Rights Council stated:

The New Yorker magazine cites the group stating that in the five years since the war started "the Syrian government has assassinated, bombed, and tortured to death almost seven hundred medical personnel."  (Armed opposition groups, including ISIL, are estimated to have killed 27 personnel.)

Physician Annie Sparrows believes an explanation for the killing is that the Syrian government has come to view doctors as dangerous, their ability to heal rebel fighters and civilians in rebel-held areas a "weapon" against the government. Over the 2.5 years, doctors, nurses, dentists, and pharmacists who provide medical care to civilians in contested areas have been arrested and detained; paramedics have been tortured and used as human shields, ambulances have been targeted by snipers and missiles; medical facilities have been destroyed; the pharmaceutical industry devastated. In 2011, there were more than 30,000 doctors in Syria. Now, more than 16,000 doctors have fled, and many of those left are in hiding. More than ninety have been assassinated for doing their jobs and at least 36 paramedics, in uniform on authorized missions, have been killed by Syrian military snipers or shot dead at checkpoints.

As of August 2016, more than 200 medical facilities have been attacked by the regime and its allies since the start of the war, and according to The Economist, "Experts reckon that no previous war has witnessed such widespread, systematic targeting of hospitals and medical workers."

The 2019–2020 UN HRC report for the first time directly accused Russian Air Force of "indiscriminate attacks in civilian areas" in connection to bombing of refugee shelter in Haas and market place in Ma’arrat al-Nu’man in summer 2019, and described them as "amounting to the war crime".

Sexual violence

Men and women have been subjected to sexual violence by government forces. Amnesty International has received reports of men being raped. According to the UN, sexual violence in detention is directed principally against men and boys, rather than women and girls:

Human Rights Watch has also reported these sexual crimes being committed by Syrian government forces.

Syrian activists claim women were abducted and raped in rebellious parts of the country, possibly using sexual violence as a means of quelling dissent. An opposition campaigner supplied The Globe and Mail with details about six previously unknown cases of violence against women, saying that more such incidents remain hidden as Damascus struggles to contain the uprising. Syrian refugees fleeing to Turkey reported mass rape by Syrian soldiers, more than 400 women were raped and sexually abused.

On 13 August 2012, a sergeant in the special forces who had defected claimed that Alawite officers ordered the rape of teenage girls in Homs, who would be shot afterwards. The defected sergeant further said that soldiers who refused were shot by the army Also in 2012, Norwegian Foreign Minister Espen Barth Eide angrily declared that rape during the Bosnian War "is repeating itself in Syria—tens of thousands of rapes."

A report released 14 January 2013 by the International Rescue Committee stated that a primary reason Syrian refugees flee is because of fear of rape.

By late November 2013, according to the Euro-Mediterranean Human Rights Network (EMHRN) report entitled "Violence against Women, Bleeding Wound in the Syrian Conflict", approximately 6,000 women have been raped (including gang-rape) since the start of the conflict – with figures likely to be much higher given that most cases go unreported. According to the EMHRN report, most were victims of government forces mostly "during governmental raids, at checkpoints and within detention facilities" and many of the rapes resulted in pregnancies.

Free Syrian Army and other armed opposition fighters
In 2012, the United Nations-sponsored "Independent International Commission of Inquiry on the Syrian Arab Republic" reported that rebels had committed war crimes, but that they "did not reach the gravity, frequency and scale" of those by state forces. The Commission alleged that the armed opposition groups of: unlawful killing; torture and ill-treatment; kidnapping and hostage taking; and the use of children in dangerous non-combat roles—since December 2011. In 2012, Amnesty confirmed that Armed opposition fighters or jihadis were guilty of having tortured and executed captured soldiers and militiamen, as well as known or perceived civilian collaborators, and later condemned the opposition fighters responsible for an attack on a pro-Assad TV station in June 2012 in which media workers were killed. The Assad government's sectarian shabiha paramilitaries "have been responsible for a vast numbers of killings, which has made it more difficult for insurgents to resist the urge to act in reprisal."

Child soldiers
The use of child soldiers by Syrian rebels have been documented in Western media and NGOs through the course of the war."Radhika Coomaraswamy, the UN special representative for children and armed conflict, said in March 2012 that she had received claims that the Free Syrian Army was using children as fighters. A UN report in April 2012 also mentioned "credible allegations" that rebels, including the FSA, were using child fighters, despite stated FSA policy of not recruiting any child under the age of 17, but a later one in June 2012 made no mention of this, only reporting that opposition fighters were using children in non-combat roles. Still, in an interview to AP, one rebel commander stated that his 16-year-old son had died in clashes with government troops as a rebel fighter. He also confirmed that his group had been releasing prisoners in bomb-rigged cars turning drivers into unwitting suicide bombers.

The FSA was mentioned in a 2014 Human Rights Watch report detailing the widespread practice of using child soldiers by non-state armed groups, the report interviewed children as young as 14 who fought with the FSA. In 2014, the United Nations reported that the Free Syrian army had recruited more than 142 child soldiers. The UN reported stated "fragmentation of FSA resulted in localized and variable recruitment, training and salary practices. During armed battles, children were used for fighting, attending to the wounded or for recording events for propaganda purposes."

In 2016, the United Nations verified another 62 cases where Free Syrian Army had recruited and used child soldiers. A 2016 report by UNICEF found that "all parties to the conflict" were recruiting under age fighters.

On 30 June 2017, the military leaders of the 21st Combined Force, 23rd Division, Central Division and the 1st Coastal Division signed the Geneva Call Deed of Commitment.

Effect on children 
A report from UNICEF estimates that over 5 million children are in need in Syria, and due to the spillover effect, 2.5 million more children are in need in neighbouring countries like Jordan and Iraq. From 2014 through 2019, 5,427 children were killed, averaging out to one child death every 10 hours. 60% of child deaths were due to murders and injuries,  with the effect of the use of explosives close behind. The WHO reported that the war has resulted in nearly three-quarters of hospitals in Syria were unable to function and are now being used as military bases. The long-term conflict has also resulted in 60.5% of Syrian students developing one of the following mental health conditions: post-traumatic stress disorder (35.1%), depression (32.0%), and anxiety (29.5%). From January 2019 to June 2019, there were 74 attacks on schools in Syria, resulting in over 2 million children being out of school. With limited resources due to the war, 83% of people live in poverty, which has resulted in 49% of children from ages 10 to 16 working. In May 2020, following nine years of gruesome war and coronavirus pandemic, inflation in Syria rose to an all-time high since April 2011. The situation resulted in doubling of food prices in just over six months and "children going to bed hungry," Imran Riza, a UN's top official based in Damascus informed.

Crimes against minorities

In April 2012, the Farouq Brigades was accused of collecting jizyah, or taxes imposed on non-Muslims living under Muslim rule, in Christian areas of Homs province. However, the group denied this and the Institute for the Study of War said that "the accusation is likely from the Assad regime". There were also reports that the group had expelled 90% of the Christian population of Homs City. However, Jesuits in Homs disputed the cause of the exodus, and said that Christians were not targeted specifically, but fled the city on their own initiative because of the ongoing conflict. According to interviews made by McClatchy Newspapers of refugees in Lebanon, there was no targeting of Christians because of their religion. Rather, a number of government-affiliated Christians were seized by the Farouq Brigades, which led to some Christians fleeing the area.

In 2014, the UN Commission of Inquiry reported that since July 2013 Jabhat Al-Nusra, at times in coordination with other armed groups, carried out a series of killings of Kurdish civilians in Al Youssoufiyah, Qamishli and Al-Asadia (Al-Hasakah). During a raid by ISIS, Jabhat Al-Nusra, the Islamic Front and FSA battalions, fighters killed a Kurdish Yazidi man in Al-Asadia who refused to convert to Islam.

During the Syrian Civil War, the Alawites have suffered as a result of their perceived loyalty to the Assad government, many fearing that a negative outcome for the government in the conflict would result in an existential threat to their community. In February 2014, Jund al-Aqsa captured the town of Ma'an and reportedly massacred more than 21 Alawite civilians, half of them women and children. On 12 May 2016, militants of the Al-Qaeda linked Al-Nusra Front and Ahrar al-Sham attacked and captured the Alawite village of Zara'a, Southern Hama Governorate. The Syrian Observatory for Human Rights said that civilians had been kidnapped and the pro-gvoernment media reported that Syrian Arab Red Crescent said that 42 civilians and seven NDF militiamen were killed during the militant attack. Additionally, some pro-Syrian government news sources reported that around 70 civilians, including women and children were kidnapped and taken to Al-Rastan Plains. Some of the captured were pro-government troops.

Torture, kidnappings, executions & sexual violence
On 20 March 2012, Human Rights Watch issued an open letter to the opposition (including the FSA), accusing them of carrying out kidnappings, torture and executions, and calling on them to halt these unlawful practices.

On 22 May 2012, an FSA brigade was alleged by Syrian state media to have kidnapped 11 Lebanese pilgrims coming from Iran. Although the Lebanese government denied it, the kidnappers said four of them were killed in an airstrike by the Syrian Air Force and the rest were released unharmed.

On 20 July 2012, Iraq's deputy interior minister, Adnan al-Assadi, claimed that Iraqi border guards had witnessed the FSA take control of a border post, detain a Syrian Army lieutenant colonel, and then cut off his arms and legs before executing 22 Syrian soldiers.

In July 2012, the Daoud Battalion, operating in the Jabal Zawiya area, reportedly used captured soldiers in proxy bombings. This involved tying the captured soldier into a car loaded with explosives and forcing him to drive to an Army checkpoint, where the explosives would be remotely detonated.

The United Nations report on war crimes states that the FSA's execution of five Alawite soldiers in Latakia, post-July 2012, was a war crime. The report states, "In this instance, the FSA perpetrated the war crime of execution without due process."

In August 2012, witnesses reported rebels conducting a "trial by grave" in which an alleged government soldier was given a mock trial next to a pre-made grave and executed on the spot by members of the FSA Amr bin al-Aas Brigade. One rebel was quoted as saying: "We took him right to his grave and, after hearing the witnesses' statements, we shot him dead". In 2012/13, the FSA was accused of summarily executing numerous prisoners who it claimed were are government soldiers or shabiha, and people who it claims are informers. A rebel commander in Damascus said that over the months his unit had executed perhaps 150 people that the "military council" had found to be informers. He explained: "If a man is accused of being an informer, he is judged by the military council. Then he is either executed or released". Nadim Houry, a Middle East researcher for Human Rights Watch argued that "Intentionally killing anyone, even a shabiha, once he is outside of combat is a war crime, regardless of how horrible the person may have been". On 10 August 2012, a report indicated that Human Rights Watch was investigating rebel forces for such killings. The FSA, for its part, stated that they would put those fighters that had conducted the unlawful killings on trial.

On 13 August 2012, a series of three videos surfaced showing executions of prisoners, apparently by rebel forces, in Aleppo province. In one video, six postal workers were being thrown off the main postal building in Al-Bab to their deaths, purportedly by FSA fighters. The gunmen claimed they were shabiha. On 10 September 2012 the FSA's Hawks of Syria brigade reportedly executed more than 20 Syrian soldiers captured in Hanano military base.

In September 2012, the northern branch of the Farouq Brigades was accused of kidnapping and killing Abu Mohamad al-Absi, a Syrian Jihadist who led a group of foreign fighters. The local Farouq Brigade leader said the foreign fighters had ignored their demands to leave the Bab al-Hawa border post. He said that al-Absi had "raised the al-Qaeda flag, and al-Qaeda is not welcomed by us".

On 2 November 2012 the FSA's al-Siddiq Battalion kidnapped and executed prominent Syrian actor Mohammed Rafeh. It claimed he was a member of the shabiha and was carrying a gun and military ID.

In December 2012, militants abducted an NBC News Team of six journalists around NBC's chief foreign correspondent Richard Engel. Engel initially blamed pro-regime Shabiha militants, but it turned out the perpetrators were most likely the FSA-affiliated rebel group North Idlib Falcons Brigade.

In May 2013, a video was posted on the internet appearing to show a rebel cutting organs from the dead body of a Syrian soldier and putting one in his mouth, "as if he is taking a bite out of it". He appears to call rebels to follow his example and terrorize the Alawite sect. Humans Rights Watch (HRW) confirmed the authenticity of the footage, and stated that "The mutilation of the bodies of enemies is a war crime". The rebel was Khalid al-Hamad, known by his nom de guerre "Abu Sakkar", a commander of the Independent Omar al-Farouq Brigade. The BBC described it as an offshoot of the FSA's Farouq Brigades, while HRW said it is "not known" whether the Brigade is part of the FSA. The incident was condemned by the FSA's Chief of Staff and the Syrian National Coalition said that Abu Sakkar would be put on trial. Abu Sakkar said the mutilation was revenge. He claimed to have found a video on the soldier's cellphone in which the soldier sexually abuses a woman and her two daughters, along with other videos of Assad loyalists raping, torturing, dismembering and killing people, including children. He further stated that if the war was to continue, "all Syrian people" would be like him. The rebel Supreme Military Council called for Abu Sakkar's arrest, saying it wants him "dead or alive". He was reported killed in northwest Latakia province on 6 April 2016 by the Syrian Army, by then apparently affiliated to the al-Qaeda linked Al-Nusra Front.

On 3 June 2014, the Army of Mujahideen announced the expulsion of 19th Division's Ansar Brigade and its leader, Abu Bakr, accusing them of theft and kidnapping.

On 30 June 2015, Jaysh al-Islam's website published a 20-minute video that showed its fighters executing 18 alleged ISIL militants by shotgun. The video mimics the imagery that ISIL has used for similar filmed executions; however, it reversed the imagery by having the executioners wearing orange prisoner outfits and the victims being dressed in black robes. The video, which included some English subtitles, stated the killings were in revenge for recent beheadings of captured Jaysh al-Islam fighters by ISIL. It also showed a Jaysh al-Islam sharia official condemning ISIS as "Khawarij" (deviating from mainstream Islam).

In 2016, courts affiliated with the Levant Front were accused of summary killings by Amnesty International.

After their capture of the town of Jarabulus from ISIL in September 2016, Kurdish media reported that Sultan Murad Division fighters published pictures of themselves torturing four YPG members prisoners of war, who were captured by the rebel group while, according to YPG claims, trying to evacuate civilians. Two of the Sultan Murad Division fighters who had been involved in the torture of POWs were later captured and questioned by the Anti-Terror Units. On 10 January 2017, the Hawar News Agency claimed that the brigade had tortured a civilian from Tat Hims to death, releasing footage of his corpse.

Jaysh al-Nasr have taken mainly-Alawite civilians, including children, as prisoners. 112 of them were released from Qalaat al-Madiq on 7 February 2017 as part of a prisoner exchange.

In August 2018, a woman from Hama accused Mohammed Jassim, known as "Abu Amsha", leader of Suleyman-Shah Brigade of raping her. In June 2020, a 16-year-old Kurdish girl was found dead in al-Fayruziyah near Azaz, she was kidnapped on 23 May by Sultan Murad Division from Darwish near Sharran in Afrin District.

In December 2020, there were reports that detained women from Afrin were transferred to Libya by mercenaries.

Shelling of civilian areas
On 25 October 2013, the Sultan Murad Division shelled a monastery in Aleppo.

In a video from February 2016 circulating on social media showing a Sultan Murad Division artillery team in Aleppo in action, an explicit order to fire on civilians appears to be given. 

According to an Amnesty International report from May 2016, indiscriminate shelling of Sheikh Maqsoud by Islamist rebel groups, including the Sultan Murad Division, killed between February and April 2016 at least 83 civilians, including 30 children, and injured more than 700 civilians. Amnesty International's regional director suggested that these repeated indiscriminate attacks constitute war crimes.

Islamist rebel groups have multiple times shelled Sheikh Maqsood neighbourhood, causing destruction of property and injury and death of civilians. In May 2016, Amnesty International's regional director suggested that the attacks on Sheikh Maqsood constitute "war crimes". Between February and April 2016 more than 83 civilians were killed by the attacks. In mid-June 2016 the US-supported Syrian Democratic Forces (of which the YPG are a component) and Russia accused the rebel militias of causing the death of over 40 civilians in the month, and an accumulated 1,000 civilian deaths, through indiscriminate shelling of Sheikh Maqsood. It also reported their alleged use of chemical weapons. A United Nations report in February 2017 came to the conclusion that during the siege of Eastern Aleppo the joint operations room of Syrian rebel factions Fatah Halab, after vowing to take revenge on the Kurds in Sheikh Maqsoud, intentionally attacked civilian inhabited neighbourhoods of the Kurdish enclave, killing and  maiming dozens of civilians, and that these acts constitute the war crime of directing attacks against a civilian population.

Acts against civilian activists
After Captain Al Qatahneh, the leader of the Southern Front's Omari Brigades, was killed in a gun battle with an opposition activist named Qaisar Habib on 28 August 2014, the activist, severely wounded and admitted to a hospital, was murdered on 19 October by Omari Brigades fighters.

In July 2016, in Aleppo, media activists accusing the Levant Front of corruption and otherwise criticizing the group have received threats and faced reprisal attacks.

In November 2016 in Tyrol, Austria, a former fighter of the Farouq Brigades was prosecuted for the summary execution of 20 wounded Syrian Army soldiers while in Homs between 2013 and 2014. In May 2017, he was found guilty and was sentenced to life imprisonment in Austria.

On 30 April 2017, Jaysh al-Islam fighters opened fire on demonstrators who called for an end to the rebel infighting. Between 26 April and 1 May, more than 95 rebels were killed during clashes between Jaysh al-Islam, Tahrir al-Sham, and the Rahman Legion. The clashes led to Syrian Army advances in eastern Damascus.

Use of captives as human shields
On 1 November 2015, an opposition media outlet, Shaam News Network, posted a video showing Jaysh al-Islam militants had locked people in cages and spread out 100 cages containing about 7 captives each through Eastern Ghouta, northeast of Damascus, to use them as human shields against Syrian government air raids. According to the Syrian Observatory for Human Rights, the caged people being used as human shields were captured Alawite military officers and their families who had been kidnapped by Jaish al-Islam two years ago outside Adra al-Ummaliyah, a government-held neighbourhood in Eastern Ghouta.

Other alleged war crimes

On 9 September 2012 the FSA reportedly exploded a car bomb near al-Hayat Hospital and the Central Hospital in Aleppo. According to Syrian state media, at least 30 people were killed and more than 64 wounded. The FSA claimed that the Army had occupied the hospital buildings and were using them as a base.

In 2014, according to the Syrian Observatory for Human Rights, the 16th Division's Badr Martyrs Brigade, led by Khaled Hayani, is responsible for the deaths of more than 203 civilians, including 42 children, at least 25 women, and 136 men, with more than 900 wounded, 175 of them seriously, in the city of Aleppo between July and December 2014 with hell cannons and other mortars, in addition to improvised explosive devices.

On 2 August 2016, fighters from the Youth of Sunna Forces raided the house of its deputy leader Mohammad Tohme and proceeded beat his father and shot his brother.

Following the Operation Olive Branch, the Suleyman-Shah Brigade and other Turkmen militias were accused of demographic change by removing Kurds from their houses and settling Turkmens from other regions in Afrin and its countryside. In addition, the Hamza Division had their own prisons where Kurdish women were held captive there.

Response to some of the allegations
In a video uploaded to the Internet in early August 2013, an FSA representative announced that, in response to international concerns, FSA units would follow the Geneva Convention's guidelines for the treatment of prisoners and would guarantee its captives food, medical attention and holding areas away from combat zones. He also invited Red Cross workers to inspect their detention facilities. On 8 August, FSA commanders distributed an 11-point code of conduct signed by scores of brigade commanders and rebel leaders. It states that all fighters must "respect human rights ... our tolerant religious principles and international human rights law – the same human rights that we are struggling for today".

Islamic State of Iraq and the Levant and other jihadist groups

In 2015 Human Rights Watch accused the extremist Islamist groups Jabhat al-Nusra and ISIL of "committed systematic rights abuses, including intentionally targeting and abducting civilians."

On 31 March, Human Rights Watch has claimed that ISIL militants killed at least 35 civilians after they briefly seized the village of Mab`oujeh in Hama countryside. In a June 2015 attack on the northern Syrian city of Kobani, ISIL deliberately killed between 233 and 262 civilians. According to witnesses, the attackers killed civilians using several ways, including automatic weapons, machine guns and rifles. They also used grenades and snipers fired on civilians from rooftops as they tried to retrieve the dead. In other incident, witnesses told Human Rights Watch that ISIL execute people in public in the governorates of Raqqa and Deir al-Zor. The victims were shot, beheaded, crucified, or stoned to death depending on the charge.

In 2016, the Omari Brigades participated in the fight between the Syrian opposition and two Islamic State of Iraq and the Levant-affiliated groups, the Yarmouk Martyrs Brigade and the Islamic Muthanna Movement. On 1 April, ISIL attempted to assassinate Fares Adib al-Baydar, the former brigade leader.

Syrian Democratic Forces 

In June 2014, Human Rights Watch criticized the YPG for accepting minors into their ranks, picking up on multiple earlier reports of teenage fighters serving in the YPG, with a report by the United Nations Secretary General stating that at least 24 minors under age of 18 had been recruited by YPG. In response, the YPG and YPJ signed the Geneva Call Deed of Commitment protecting children in armed conflict, prohibiting sexual violence and against gender discrimination in July 2014, and Kurdish security forces (YPG and Asayish) began receiving human rights training from Geneva Call and other international organisations. Despite this however, the SDF was reported to be continuing the use of child soldiers, and in 2020, United Nations reported SDF as the largest faction in the Syrian civil war by the number recruited child soldiers with 283 child soldiers.

In June 2015 the Turkish government and Amnesty International reported that the YPG was carrying out an ethnic cleansing of non-Kurdish populations as part of a plan to join the Jazira and Euphrates regions into a single territory. The report makes accusations of looting, coercing civilians to join their armed forces and the forced targeted displacement of 1400 families in the Turkman villages of Hammam al-Turkman, 800 Turkmen from Mela Berho and Suluk residents.

On 15 March 2017, a video surfaced that showed members of a Syrian Democratic Forces component militia, the Northern Sun Battalion, torturing an ISIL fighter, who had been captured while planting mines. One of these mines had killed nine fighters of the battalion, leading five others to take revenge on the ISIL militant. The Manbij Military Council condemned the act, and announced that the involved Northern Sun Battalion fighters would be held for trial for violating the Geneva Conventions. The five accused were subsequently arrested on 17 March.

Violations by various or unknown parties

Use of chemical weapons

A UN fact-finding mission was established in March 2013  to investigate 16 alleged chemical weapons attacks. Seven of them were investigated (nine were dropped for lack of "sufficient or credible information") and in four cases the UN inspectors confirmed use of sarin gas . The final report was published in December 2013, finding that chemical weapons were likely used in five of the seven attacks investigated, and that sarin was likely used in four of the attacks. There was no finding on the likely perpetrators of the attacks, being outside the scope of the investigation.

On 21 August 2013 two opposition-controlled areas in the suburbs around Damascus, Syria were struck by rockets containing the chemical agent sarin. Estimates of those killed by the attack ranged from 281 to 1,729. The attack was the deadliest use of chemical weapons since the Iran–Iraq War. Following an inspection by a UN investigation team confirmed "clear and convincing evidence" of the use of sarin delivered by surface-to-surface rockets,  a 2014 report by the UN Human Rights Council found that "significant quantities of sarin were used in a well-planned indiscriminate attack targeting civilian-inhabited areas, ... The evidence available concerning the nature, quality and quantity of the agents used on 21 August indicated that the perpetrators likely had access to the chemical weapons stockpile of the Syrian military, as well as the expertise and equipment necessary to manipulate safely large amount of chemical agents."  Based on the trajectories calculated by the UN mission, Human Rights Watch states that the missiles were launched from a large military base on Mount Qasioun which is home to the Republican Guard 104th Brigade.

On 7 April 2016, the Sheikh Maqsood neighborhood in Aleppo was shelled with mortars containing chemical agents. Russian media claimed that a spokesman for the rebel group Jaysh al-Islam admitted that "forbidden" weapons had been used against Kurdish militia and civilians in Aleppo. He was quoted as stating that "One of our commanders has unlawfully used a type of weapon that is not included in our list". He did not specify what substances were used but, according to Kurdish Red Crescent, the symptoms are consistent with the use of chlorine gas or other agents. Welat Memo, a physician with the Kurdish Red Crescent said that the people affected are "vomiting and having difficulty in breathing." Jaysh al-Islam subsequently clarified that it was referring to "modified Grad rockets," not chemical weapons.

Violations of free speech and attacks on media and journalists 

Except for those hand-picked by the government, journalists have been banned from reporting in Syria. Those who have entered the country regardless have been targeted. Within a month of the protests taking off, at least seven local and international journalists were detained, and at least one of these was beaten. Citizen journalist Mohammed Hairiri was arrested in April 2012, tortured in prison, and sentenced to death in May 2012 for giving an interview for Al Jazeera. Palestinian of Jordanian citizen Salameh Kaileh was tortured and detained in deplorable conditions before being deported.

According to the Committee to Protect Journalists, 13 journalists were killed in work-related incidents during the first eighteen months of the uprising. During the same period, Reporters Without Borders said a total of 33 journalists were killed. Many, such as Marie Colvin, were killed by government forces, but at least one, French journalist Gilles Jacquier, was killed by rebel fire.

The Committee to Protect Journalists reports that as of June 2016, 95 journalists have been killed in Syria since 2011. 
In late 2013 the Associated Press reported that 30 journalists—half of them foreign reporters, half of them Syrian—have been kidnapped or gone missing in Syria since Syria's civil war began in early 2011. 
According to AP, "Jihadi groups are believed responsible for most kidnappings" from Summer 2013 to November, but "government-backed militias, criminal gangs and rebels affiliated with the Western-backed Free Syrian Army" also have been involved with various motives.
The Atlantic blamed the kidnappings on chaos and extremist armed opposition groups motivated by a "combination" of criminality and jihadism, and credited the abductions with "bringing on-the-ground coverage" of the civil war to a halt.  According to the Committee to Protect Journalists, the "Islamic State" group is responsible for killing "at least 27 journalists since 2013, with at least 11 others missing and feared dead". The group also credits 59% of killings of journalists in Syria to the government, military or paramilitary groups.

International media and journalists operate with few restrictions in the Democratic Federation of Northern Syria, the only region in Syria where they can operate freely.

Attacks on local Christians 

Local Christian minorities are also facing many human rights violations. Two bishops had been kidnapped on 22 April 2013 and have not been heard from since. Aleppo's Greek Orthodox Bishop Boulos Yazij and Syriac Orthodox Bishop Yohanna Ibrahim were kidnapped at gun point by unknown combatants when returning from a humanitarian mission to Turkey. During the kidnapping, the deacon driving them was shot and killed. "One month after two Orthodox Christian bishops were kidnapped by gunmen in Syria, officials say they still have no idea what has happened to the missing prelates". All of which indicating that it was an action by local terror gangs.

Violations by foreign state actors

US-led coalition
The Syrian Network for Human Rights reported that 2,286 civilian deaths were caused by US-led coalition airstrikes fighting ISIL since the beginning of the campaign until September 2017, raising concerns, including from Human Rights Watch, that the coalition failed to take necessary precautions to minimize civilian casualties.

Turkey 

Next to giving material support to parties in the Syrian Civil War – to the Islamic State of Iraq and the Levant (ISIL) as well as to other Islamist rebel groups – who would fight the Democratic Federation of Northern Syria, Turkey has across the border shelled population centers in northern Syria, causing property damage but also injury and death of civilians. Turkey has also been accused of actively supporting the indiscriminate shelling of civilian population centers by opposition militias, causing 1,000 civilian deaths in the Sheikh Maqsood neighbourhood of Aleppo alone.

Frequently accusations are made from local sources as well as Democratic Federation of Northern Syria authorities against Turkish border guards shooting to kill at civilians at the border. In one of the most prominent of such accusations, a report from ANF on 28 September 2016 alleged that "Turkish soldiers kill 17 civilians on Rojava border in two days", building on a report of the Syrian Observatory for Human Rights from the previous day of 12 civilians killed. Concerning one of the events in these two days, SANA reported that "local sources told SANA reporter in Hasaka that the Turkish army opened fire on a number of civilians at Kahyla village which is located between the cities of Ras al-Ayn and Tal Abyad, killing nine civilians including children, and injuring others. Some of the injured persons, who were rushed to Ras al-Ayn city for treatment, confirmed that Turkish soldiers fired indiscriminately at them."

In October 2016, the co-chairman of the Democratic Federation of Northern Syria's leading Democratic Union Party (PYD), Salih Muslim, has accused Turkey of ethnic cleansing in the border area between Azaz and Jarabulus which at the time is occupied by Turkish-backed opposition rebels, saying it has driven thousands of Kurds from their land in villages near the border.

A report of the Independent International Commission of Inquiry on the Syrian Arab Republic, submitted to the UN Human Rights Council pursuant to its resolution 43/28 for consideration at the 45th session of the Human Rights Council (commencing 14 September 2020), the Independent International Commission presents evidence of numerous human rights abuses against civilian population, and especially Kurdish civilian population, by the Turkish state and "non-state factions" such as the Syrian National Army, acting as de facto agents of Turkey. In paragraph 47, the Report addresses looting and property appropriation, noting that  "[t]hroughout the Afrin region, multiple accounts indicate that the property of Kurdish owners was looted and appropriated by Syrian National Army members in a coordinated manner. For example, in September 2019, civilians in the Shaykh al-Hadid subdistrict (of the Afrin region) described how members of Division 14, Brigade 142 (the Suleiman Shah Brigade) of the Syrian National Army had gone from door to door instructing Kurdish families with fewer than three members to vacate their houses to accommodate individuals arriving from outside of Afrin."

Paragraph 48 of the Report indicates that "[a]lso in Afrin, in December 2019, a senior member of another Syrian National Army brigade went from door to door in a large residential building, requesting proof of ownership only from the Kurdish inhabitants. One resident, unable to provide such documentation, was forced to appear at the brigade's security office, where he was verbally abused and told ‘if it were up to me, I would kill every Kurd from 1 to 80 years old’. He was also threatened with detention. Fearing for his family's safety, the man fled shortly thereafter. One woman who approached Turkish officials in Sheikh Hadid district to complain about the appropriation of her home was told to speak with the Suleiman Shah Brigade, to whom authority had apparently been delegated by Turkey to deal with such cases."
In paragraph 51, the Report states that "the home of a Kurdish family was appropriated by members of Division 22 (the Hamza Brigade) and later converted into an institute for Qur’anic studies run by a Turkish NGO, the Foundation for Human Rights and Freedoms and Humanitarian Relief. On 22 June, its official opening was inaugurated by the governor of Şanlıurfa (Turkey). Reports of the use of civilian houses for military purposes by Turkish ground forces in Dawoudiya village have also been received."

The Report cites numerous examples of torture and cruel, inhuman and degrading treatment of Kurdish civilians by Turkish state agents. Paragraph 54 of the Report states that "[i]n detention, civilians – primarily of Kurdish origin – were beaten, tortured, denied food or water, and interrogated about their faith and ethnicity. One boy described to the Commission how he had been detained by the Syrian National Army Military Police in the city of Afrin in mid-2019, and held for five months in the Syrian National Army headquarters, before being transferred to the Afrin central prison and released in March 2020. While detained, both Syrian National Army members and Turkish-speaking officials dressed in military fatigues were present. The boy was handcuffed and hung from a ceiling. He was then blindfolded and repeatedly beaten with plastic tubes. The boy described how the officers interrogated him about his alleged links to the self-administration."

The Report also presents ample evidence of sexual and gender-based violence perpetrated by the Turkish state. In paragraph 59, it indicates that "[s]ince 2019, Kurdish women throughout the Afrin and Ra's al-Ayn regions have faced acts of intimidation by Syrian National Army brigade members, engendering a pervasive climate of fear which in effect confined them to their homes. Women and girls have also been detained by Syrian National Army fighters, and subjected to rape and sexual violence – causing severe physical and psychological harm."

Russia 

Russia has been alleged to be responsible for multiple war crimes and human rights violations during the war. This includes the targeting of hospitals and rescue workers, extensive use of cluster munitions in violation of United Nations resolution 2139 of 22 February 2014, use of white phosphorus against targets in Raqqa and Idlib, causing civilian casualties with the weapons, and air strikes on densely populated civilian areas. A 2020 report by UN Human Rights Council for the first time directly laid responsibility on Russian Air Force of indiscriminate attacks on civilian targets "amounting to a war crime".

International Criminal Justice for Human Rights Violations in Syria

Swedish War Crimes Trial
In 2017, a Swedish court convicted former Syrian soldier Muhammad Abdullah of war crimes committed during the Syrian war and sentenced him to eight months in prison. Abdullah had reportedly moved to Sweden three years previously, and was identified by other Syrian refugees after posting an image on Facebook showing him with his boot on a corpse, smiling. Prosecutors failed to prove that he killed the person depicted, but convicted him of "violating human dignity" in what the New York Times described as a "landmark verdict".

The Al-Khatib Trial
On 14 February 2021, Eyad Al-Gharib, a former intelligence officer of Syrian President Assad's regime, was convicted by the Higher Regional Court of Koblenz, Germany of assisting the torture of prisoners under the process of Universal Jurisdiction. The Al-Khatib trial was a landmark trial in that it was the first time a member of Assad's regime was openly implicated for a Crime Against Humanity and was regarded by many human rights activists as the beginning of securing accountability for the Syrian government's systemic usage of torture against civilians. The case stemmed from a series of joint complaints filed in 2015 in Germany, Austria, Sweden, and Norway by Syrian survivors, activists, and lawyers. Al-Gharib was accused of being a part of a police unit that arrested civilians following anti-government protests in the city of Douma and took them to the detention center known as Al-Khatib, Branch 252, where they were subjected to torture. Al-Gharib was convicted of accessory to crimes against humanity and sentenced to four and a half years in prison. He had come to Germany seeking asylum in 2018 after defecting his position as a sergeant major in Assad's regime and was arrested a year later by German police. Al-Gharib went on trial in April 2020 with a senior Syrian ex-official, Anwar Raslan, who is accused of overseeing the torture of detainees at the Al-Khatib prison. Al Gharib had testified against Raslan during his pretrial police interrogation and implicated the ex-official in more than 10 deaths of prisoners. On 13 January 2022, Raslan was sentenced by the state court in Koblenz to imprisonment for life "for a crime against humanity in the form of killing, torture, severe deprivation of liberty, rape and sexual coercion in unity of action with 27 counts of Mord, 25 counts of dangerous bodily harm, two counts of especially serious rape, sexual coercion, 14 counts of deprivation of liberty for more than one week, two counts of hostage-taking and three counts of sexual abuse of prisoners." , the judgement was not yet legally binding, which means the defendant or his attorneys were given a week to appeal the verdict.

See also
Human rights in Syria
Human rights in ISIL-controlled territory
Human rights in Rojava

References

Notes

Syrian civil war crimes
Human rights abuses in Syria
Human rights in Kurdistan